Cercospora brunkii is a fungal plant pathogen.

References

brunkii
Fungal plant pathogens and diseases